Alfred Ortlieb was a French cinematographer who worked in the American film industry during the 1910s and 1920s.

Biography 
Alfred was born in Ivry-sur-Seine, France, to Adolphe Ortlieb. After being educated in Paris, he began his career as a salesman before working as a cinematographer at Gaumont, Selig, and Metro. He often collaborated with director René Plaissetty, and supposedly shot all of Plaissetty's early films.

Selected filmography 

 The Unfair Sex (1926) 
 Lover's Island (1925)
 The Fair Cheat (1923)
 None So Blind (1923)
 The Streets of New York (1922)
 Love's Penalty (1921)
 The Black Panther's Cub (1921)
 The Bait (1921)
 Deep Waters (1920)
 The White Circle (1920)
 The Empire of Diamonds (1920)
 Lifting Shadows (1920)
 A Modern Salome (1920)
 Tarnished Reputations (1920)
 The A.B.C. of Love (1919)
 The Thirteenth Chair (1919)
 The Twin Pawns (1919)
 Waifs (1918)
 Greater Love Hath No Man (1915)
 The Shooting of Dan McGrew (1915)

References 

French cinematographers
1888 births
People from Ivry-sur-Seine
Year of death missing